Harry Warner (1881–1958), co-founder of Warner Bros.

Harry Warner may also refer to:

Harry Warner Jr. (1922–2003), journalist, science fiction fan and historian
 Harry Warner (baseball) (1928–2015), American baseball outfielder, coach and manager
 Harry Waldo Warner (1874-1945), English composer and viola player
 Harry Warner (Shortland Street), a character on the New Zealand soap opera Shortland Street

See also
 Harold J. Warner (1890–1982), American attorney and judge in Oregon
Henry Warner (disambiguation)